Holum is a former municipality that was located in the old Vest-Agder county in Norway.  The  municipality existed from 1838 until its dissolution in 1964.  The administrative centre was the village of Krossen where Holum Church is located. The municipality was located in the present-day municipality of Lindesnes in what is now Agder county.

History
The parish of Holme was established as a municipality on 1 January 1838 (see formannskapsdistrikt law). During the 1960s, there were many municipal mergers across Norway due to the work of the Schei Committee. On 1 January 1964, most of Holum (population: 1,127) was merged with the town of Mandal and the municipality of Halse og Harkmark to form a new, larger Mandal municipality. The remainder of Holum (the Stubstad and Svalemyren areas, with a population of 9) was merged into the neighboring municipality of Søgne.

Name
The municipality (originally the parish) was named after the old Holme farm, since that is the location of Holum Church. The name is a combination of the word hol or hull meaning "hole" and the word heimr meaning "home".  The spelling of the name was changed from Holme to Holum in 1911.

Government

The municipal council  of Holum was made up of representatives that were elected to four year terms.  The party breakdown of the final municipal council was as follows:

See also
List of former municipalities of Norway

References

External links
Weather information for Holum 

Lindesnes
Former municipalities of Norway
1838 establishments in Norway
1964 disestablishments in Norway